Vĩnh Trung is a rural commune of Vị Thủy District, Hậu Giang Province, in south-western Vietnam.

References

Populated places in Hậu Giang province
Communes of Hậu Giang province